The 1950 Detroit Lions season was their 21st in the league. The team improved on their previous season's output of 4–8, winning six games. They failed to qualify for the playoffs for the 15th consecutive season.

Regular season

Schedule
 Thursday (November 23: Thanksgiving)

Standings

See also
 1950 in Michigan

References

External links
1950 Detroit Lions at Pro Football Reference
1950 Detroit Lions at jt-sw.com

Detroit Lions seasons
Detroit Lions
Detroit Lions